United Nations Security Council resolution 840, adopted unanimously on 15 June 1993, after recalling resolutions 668 (1990), 745 (1992), 810 (1993), 826 (1993), 835 (1993) and other relevant resolutions, the Council endorsed the results of the 1993 general elections in Cambodia.

Tributes were paid to the former King Norodom Sihanouk for his leadership of the Supreme National Council and to the United Nations Transitional Authority in Cambodia (UNTAC) and Yasushi Akashi, Special Representative of the Secretary-General, for their efforts during the electoral process, which had been declared free and fair.

The Council called upon all political parties to fully respect the results of the elections and to co-operate during the transition process in order to maintain stability and promote national reconciliation. Support was given to the newly elected constituent assembly which had begun its work of drawing up a constitution, of which the constituent assembly would transform itself into a legislative assembly.

The Secretary-General, Boutros Boutros-Ghali, was requested to report back by mid-July 1993 on his recommendations for the possible role the United Nations and its agencies might play after the end of the mandate of UNTAC according to the Paris Agreements.

See also
 List of United Nations Security Council Resolutions 801 to 900 (1993–1994)
 Modern Cambodia
 Transition of the People's Republic of Kampuchea to Cambodia

References

External links
 
Text of the Resolution at undocs.org

 0840
20th century in Cambodia
Political history of Cambodia
 0840
June 1993 events
1993 in Cambodia